Senta is a genus of moths of the family Noctuidae.

Species
 Senta flammea (Curtis, 1828)
 Senta lunulata (Gaede, 1916)

References
Natural History Museum Lepidoptera genus database
Senta at funet

Mythimnini